Passins is a former commune in the Isère department in southeastern France. On 1 January 2017, it was merged into the new commune Arandon-Passins.

Population

See also
Communes of the Isère department

References

Former communes of Isère
Isère communes articles needing translation from French Wikipedia